Richland Creek is a  long 4th order tributary to the Deep River in Randolph County, North Carolina.

Course
Richland Creek is formed at the confluence of North and South Prong about 0.25 miles northeast of Harveys Mountain in Randolph County, North Carolina and then flows southeasterly to join the Deep River about 1 mile northwest of Cheeks, North Carolina.

Watershed
Richland Creek drains  of area, receives about 47.1 in/year of precipitation, and has a wetness index of 387.93 and is about 58% forested.

See also
List of rivers of North Carolina

References

Rivers of North Carolina
Rivers of Randolph County, North Carolina